Paid to Dance (also known as Hard to Hold) is a 1937 drama film starring Don Terry, Jacqueline Wells and Rita Hayworth.

Plot
Government agents William Dennis and Joan Bradley are undercover, working to solve the disappearances of girls working as "taxi-dancers" of the many dance halls operated by Jack Miranda and his henchman Nifty. Dennis sets himself up as a theatrical booking agent, and shows his power by the opening and closing of Miranda's Paradise Club at will.

Cast
 Don Terry as William Dennis
 Jacqueline Wells as Joan Bradley
 Rita Hayworth as Betty Morgan
 Arthur Loft as Jack Miranda
 Paul Stanton as Charles Kennedy
 Paul Fix as Nifty
 Louise Stanley as Phyllis Parker
 Ralph Byrd as Nickels Brown
 Beatrice Curtis as Frances Mitchell
 Bess Flowers as Suzy
 Beatrice Blinn as Lois
 Jane Hamilton as Evelyn
 Dick Curtis as Mike Givens
 Al Herman as Joe Krause
 Thurston Hall as Governor
 John Gallaudet as Barney Wilson
 Horace MacMahon as LaRue
 George Lloyd as Sanders
 Ruth Hilliard as Ruth Gregory
 Ann Doran as Rose Tervor

References

External links
 

1937 drama films
1937 films
American black-and-white films
Columbia Pictures films
American drama films
Films directed by Charles C. Coleman
1930s English-language films
1930s American films